Nikolai Semyonovich Reznichenko (23 March 1952 – 6 July 2021) was a Soviet and later Russian military officer who held a number of posts in the country's border forces, reaching the rank of general-polkovnik.

Early life and service
He began his schooling in the village in 1959, and was elected secretary of the school's Komsomol organization. He began as deputy head of a border outpost, rising to head of a border detachment. In 1979 he enrolled at the Frunze Military Academy, graduating in 1982.

Combat service

Between 1984 and 1986 Reznichenko was part of the forces deployed into Afghanistan during the Soviet–Afghan War. He was involved in the fighting in 1985 around the city of Mazar-i-Sharif, when Soviet forces encircled and captured a large group of fighters, seizing a large quantity of weapons and ammunition. Reznichenko suffered a concussion during the fighting. In further fighting around the village of Barmazit, Soviet forces seized a truck carrying a large consignment of weapons and ammunition. For this operation, Reznichenko was awarded the Order of the Red Star. Over the period of his service in Afghanistan, Reznichenko was twice wounded, and received a concussion.  In addition to the Order of the Red Star, he was also awarded the Order of the Red Banner, the Order "For Personal Courage", the Democratic Republic of Afghanistan's  and various medals.

Post-Soviet career
In 1991 Reznichenko was appointed deputy chief of staff of the Central Asian Border District, and spent between 1992 and 1994 studying at the Military Academy of the General Staff of the Armed Forces of Russia.

Later life and honours
Over his career Reznichenko reached the rank of general-polkovnik, and was awarded the Order of the Red Star, the Order of the Red Banner, and Order "For Personal Courage", as well as various medals. He was married, with two sons and two grandchildren. Both of his sons followed him into the border service, and served as officers.

Reznichenko died of COVID-19 on 6 July 2021, at the age of 69. He was buried in the Federal Military Memorial Cemetery on 10 July 2021.

References

1952 births
2021 deaths
People from Apsheronsky District
Russian colonel generals
Recipients of the Order of Military Merit (Russia)
Recipients of the Order of the Red Banner
Recipients of the Order of the Red Star
Recipients of the Order "For Personal Courage"
Frunze Military Academy alumni
Military Academy of the General Staff of the Armed Forces of Russia alumni
Soviet military personnel of the Soviet–Afghan War
Deaths from the COVID-19 pandemic in Russia
Burials at the Federal Military Memorial Cemetery